Sir Seewoosagur Ramgoolam (in traditional Hindi: Shivsagar Ram Gulam)  (18 September 1900 – 15 December 1985; often referred to as Chacha Ramgoolam or SSR) was a Mauritian physician, politician, and statesman. He served as the island's only chief minister, first prime minister, and fifth governor-general.

He is widely recognized as the nation's founding father (French: père de la nation), although the anti-independence political group at the time of British Mauritius used to call him as a pun in French la perte de la nation (English: the misleader of the nation). After Guy Rozemont's death in 1956, Ramgoolam became the leader of the Labour Party of Mauritius till his death in 1985. According to Dr. A. G. Wilkins, post-doctoral researcher in contemporary Indian Ocean islands history at the University of Michigan LSA, regardless of what detractors say, Sir Shivsagar was a man of exceptional tenacity, wisdom and courage. He possessed a lion's personality and was the most respected leader of his time from the Indian Ocean islands. His leadership style was "nationalistic-progressive typical of Mustafa Kemal Atatürk, with the principles of Kemalism further complemented by elements of universal brotherhood as professed by M.L.K. Jr."

Sir Seewoosagur Ramgoolam's son, Dr. Navinchandra Ramgoolam, served as the third and fifth prime minister of Mauritius.

Early life
Sir Seewoosagur Ramgoolam, also known as Kewal, was born on 18 September 1900 at Belle Rive, Mauritius, in the district of Flacq in a Hindu Indo-Mauritian family. His father, Moheeth Ramgoolam was Indian immigrant labourer who belonged to Kurmi caste. Moheeth came to Mauritius aged 18 in a ship called The Hindoostan in 1896. His elder brother, Ramlochurn, had left the home village of Harigaon in the Bhojpur district of Bihar in search of his fortune abroad. Moheeth worked as an indentured labourer and later became a Sirdar (overseer) at Queen Victoria Sugar Estate. When he married Basmati Ramchurn in 1898, he moved to Belle Rive Sugar Estate. Basmati was a young widow born in Mauritius. She already had two sons: Nuckchadee Heeramun and Ramlall Ramchurn.

Ramgoolam had his early grounding in Bhojpuri, Indian culture and philosophy, in the local evening school of the locality (called Baitka in Mauritian Hindu term), where children of the Hindu community learnt the vernacular language and glimpses of the Hindu culture. The teacher (guruji) would teach prayers and songs. Sanskrit prayers and perennial values taken from sacred scriptures like the Vedas, the Ramayana, the Upanishads, and the Bhagavad Gita were also taught.

He enrolled in the neighbouring R.C.A. (Roman Catholic Aided) School, run by Madame Siris without his mother's knowledge. He learned History, Geography, English and French. After leaving the pre-primary school, he went to Bel Air Government School, travelling by train, until he passed the sixth standard. At the age of seven, Ramgoolam lost his father and at the age of twelve, he suffered a serious accident in a cowshed that cost him his left eye. He continued his scholarship class at the Curepipe Boys’ Government School while taking up boarding with his uncle, Harry Parsad Seewoodharry Buguth, a sworn land surveyor, in Curepipe. He would listen to the political discussions between his uncle and his circle of friends on local politics and on the current struggle for Indian independence under Mahatma Gandhi, Jawaharlal Nehru and Rash Behari Bose. These initial conversations were to form the basis of his political beliefs years later. The scholarship classes, which formed the basis of lower secondary schooling, permitted Ramgoolam to go straight for the Junior Cambridge at the Royal College, Curepipe, where he was educated by the likes of Reverend Fowler and Mr Harwood. After secondary school, Ramgoolam worked for 3 months in the Civil Service, despite racism within the organisation .

With the financial help of his brother Ramlall, Ramgoolam was able to initiate medical studies in England. In 1921, Ramgoolam set sail on one of the ships of the Messageries maritimes for Marseille, and continued by train to London, his final destination, with a transit of a couple of days in Paris. In the French capital he purchased copies of the books of André Gide and André Malraux with both of whom he struck friendship. He graduated from University College London and attended lectures at the London School of Economics.

Family life
In 1939 Ramgoolam married Sushil Ramjoorawon. She gave birth to their daughter Sunita (now Sunita Joypaul) and their son Navin Ramgoolam.

Political career before Independence
In 1935 he returned to Mauritius after completing medical studies in London and Seewoosagur worked to improve the living and working conditions of the bulk of the island's population which consisted of the descendants of indentured Indian laborers and enslaved Africans. In 1947 Ramgoolam joined the Labour Party. At that time the party was still under the leadership of its original founders Emmanuel Anquetil, Maurice Curé, Pandit Sahadeo, Renganaden Seeneevassen and Mamode Hassenjee, Jean Prosper, Barthelemy Ohsan, Samuel Barbe and Godefroy Moutia who initiated the party in 1936. In September 1940 and during the Second World War he became one of the founders of the Labour Party's newspaper Advance which advocated universal suffrage, economic reform and social justice. Ramgoolam wrote a series of articles using pseudonym Thumb Mark II which challenged the island's established conservative sugar oligarchs. He was also appointed as President of the group known as Indian Cultural Association. Seewoosagur Ramgoolam also joined the masonic fraternity and was an active member of the Loge de la Triple Espérance.

From 1940 to 1953 he was an elected Municipal Councillor in Port Louis and was re-elected to serve from 1956 to 1960. Then he was elected Deputy Mayor of Port-Louis in 1956 and became Lord Mayor  of Port Louis in 1958. Seewoosagur Ramgoolam served as Nominated Member of the Legislative Council from 1940 to 1948. At the 1948 General Elections he was elected Member of Legislative Council for Pamplemousses-Rivière du Rempart. He was re-elected to the Legislative Council in 1953, 1959 (Triolet) and 1967 (Pamplemousses-Triolet). In 1948 and 1953 he was also appointed as member of the Executive Council. From 1951 to 1956 he joined the Civil Service to work as Liaison Officer for Education before becoming first MLA for Pamplemousses-Triolet in December 1956. In 1958 the Colonial Government appointed him as Ministerial Secretary to Treasury.

He led the Mauritian Labour Party from 1959 to 1982 following the death of Guy Rozemont in March 1956.

At the 1961 Constitutional Conference in London, the Parti Mauricien was in favour of an integration with Britain rather than independence within the Commonwealth. But Britain, at that time, had already decided that it would give up all its colonies with the exception of Hong-Kong, Gibraltar and the Falklands. In fact, the die had already been cast as early as 1959 when Harold Macmillan had made his famous “Wind of change blowing over Africa” speech. After the general election of 1963, Gaetan Duval, then deputy-leader of the Parti Mauricien, again lobbied for Integration with Britain. But this was once more rejected by the British who did not consider integration as “a practical proposition for Mauritius, even if the majority of parties in Mauritius wanted it”.

Under the supervision of the Colonial Office Ramgoolam served as Chief Minister and Minister of Finance from 1961 to 1965, then as Premier from 1965 to 1968, before becoming Prime Minister in 1968. In 1963, the British Conservative government assisted him to form an All-Party Government in Mauritius. His efforts were recognised as he was honoured as knighted in the Queen's Birthday Honours of 12 June 1965.

In 1967 he cooperated with the Independent Forward Bloc (IFB) led by Sookdeo Bissoondoyal (who were advocating complete decolonization and removal of British administration from all Mauritian territories) and the Comité d'Action Musulman (CAM) led by Abdool Razack Mohamed (which campaigned for constitutional guarantees to protect the Muslim and other minority communities in an effort to prevent a circumstantial Hindu hegemony) to form the Independence Party (Mauritius). This coalition eventually led to 1968 Independence from Great Britain after the 1967 Mauritian general election.

Political career after Independence
In 1969 he contracted an alliance with his party's rival Parti Mauricien Social Démocrate (PMSD) which was led by Gaetan Duval. This alliance allowed Ramgoolam to stay in power despite the departure of its former ally IFB from the government. Sookdeo Bissoondoyal's IFB members went into opposition whilst some IFB MP's defected to the Labour Party to maintain their ministerial portfolios.

In 1973 France elevated Seewoosagur Ramgoolam to the rank of Grand Officier de la Légion d'Honneur de la République Française. At the same time his political ally Gaetan Duval was made Commandeur de la Légion d'Honneur.

Due to the poor performance of his various governments from 1967 to 1982, his party lost the 1982 general elections when none of his candidates was elected to parliament. He lost his parliamentary seat which led to further downfall of the Labour Party. He then assisted the newly formed party named MSM and its ex-MMM leader Anerood Jugnauth to win the 1983 elections. The Labour Party became a minority party in a coalition MSM-Labour government and Ramgoolam was appointed Governor-General, a position which he held until his death in 1985. Ramgoolam was succeeded as leader of the Labour Party by Sir Satcam Boolell in 1984 when the latter returned to the Labour Party after having formed and led a new party Mouvement Patriotique Mauricien (MPM) following his 1982 electoral defeat. Boolell remained president of the Labour Party until 1991.

Ramgoolam was also the Chairperson of the Organisation of African Unity from 1976 to 1977.

Legacy and recognition

Various streets and public places in Mauritius bear the name of Sir Seewoosagur Ramgoolam (SSR), such as the SSR Botanical Garden, a recreational centre for senior citizens, SSR Medical College, Pamplemousses SSR National Hospital (at the site of the defunct Royal Alfred Observatory), the island's main airport, previously called Plaisance International Airport, and Kewal Nagar (a small village previously called Belle Rive). He also figures on every Mauritian Rupee coin and on the highest note tender of Rs2,000. Monuments to him also stand in the Sir Seewoosagur Ramgoolam Botanical Garden, on Caudan Waterfront in Port Louis, and even in the village of SSR's ancestor, near Patna, Bihar in India.

See also

 History of Mauritius

References

External links

 Birth centenary celebrations of Sir Seewoosagur Ramgoolam
 Sir Seewoosagur Ramgoolam, the Rare Diplomat, by Joseph Tsang Mang Kin 

 
1900 births
1985 deaths
Mauritian physicians
Governors-General of Mauritius
Foreign Ministers of Mauritius
Alumni of University College London
Alumni of the London School of Economics
Knights Grand Cross of the Order of St Michael and St George
Labour Party (Mauritius) politicians
Mauritian Hindus
Mauritian Knights Bachelor
People from Flacq District
Prime Ministers of Mauritius
Ministers of Finance of Mauritius
Mauritian politicians of Indian descent
Members of the Privy Council of the United Kingdom